De Basis, formerly known as the Basic Income Party (BIP), is a minor political party in the Netherlands, which advocates for the implementation of a universal basic income. The party registered with the electoral council on 9 December 2013.

History 
The Basic Income Party was founded on 4 October 2013. In 2014, the party participated in the municipal elections in Amsterdam, Bergen, Deventer and Utrecht. It also planned to participate in Almere and Groningen, but pulled back two months before the election due to a lack of preparation time. The party did not win any seats.

In 2017, the party participated in the general election as part of a combined list – known as the "umbrella list" – with the Party for Human and Spirit, the Party for Children's Interests and the political movement Peace & Justice. It only participated in the seventh and eighth electoral districts (Utrecht and Arnhem). The list did not receive enough votes for a seat in the House of Representatives.

In 2018, the party took part in the municipal elections once again. This time it only participated in the municipality of Amsterdam. Despite an initiative to join forces with other minor parties, the Basic Income Party failed to win a seat in the municipal council.

In July 2020, Citizen Interests Netherlands merged into the party, and the name was changed to De Basis. The party had intended to take part in the 2021 general election, but ultimately did not submit the required documents to the Electoral Council.

Election results

General elections

Municipal elections

See also 
 Universal basic income in the Netherlands

References

External links 
 Official website

Political parties in the Netherlands
Political parties established in 2013
2013 establishments in the Netherlands
Political parties supporting universal basic income
Direct democracy parties